Sohr (also known as Sor, Sowr, and Sūr) is a village in Jabal Rural District, Kuhpayeh District in Isfahan County, Isfahan Province, Iran. At the 2006 census, its population was 109, in 34 families.

References 

Populated places in Isfahan County